Silk is a 1996 novel by the Italian writer Alessandro Baricco.  It was translated into English in 1997 by Guido Waldman. A new English translation by Ann Goldstein was published in 2006.

Plot
The extraordinary novel tells the story of a French silkworm merchant-turned-smuggler named Hervé Joncour in 19th century France who travels to Japan for his town's supply of silkworms after a disease wipes out their African supply. His first trip to Japan takes place in the Bakumatsu period, when Japan was still largely closed to foreigners. During his stay in Japan, he becomes obsessed with the concubine of a local baron. His trade in Japan and his personal relationship with the concubine are both strained by the internal political turmoil and growing anti-Western sentiment in Japan that followed the arrival of Matthew C. Perry in Edo Bay.

Adaptations
Silk has been adapted for stage and film:
 A theater adaptation was made in 2005 by Mary Zimmerman
Silk, a 2007 film

Editions
Silk (English edition) by Alessandro Baricco; translated by Guido Waldman.
 Hardcover -  published in  October 1997 by The Harvill Press
 Paperback -  published in May 1998 by The Harvill Press

References

1997 novels
Novels set in Japan
Italian novels adapted into films
Works by Alessandro Baricco
Italian novels adapted into plays
Japan in non-Japanese culture